Azzurra Air was a scheduled and charter airline based in Milan, Italy and flying to Spain, Greece, the Netherlands, Portugal and other Mediterranean destinations.

History 

The airline was established in December 1995 and was a joint venture by the Italian investment group Air International Services (51%) and by Air Malta (49%). It started operations in December 1996. AIS shares were purchased by UK based 7 Group in 2003, anticipating the purchase of Air Malta shares later that year.

In November 2003 it was announced that Azzurra Air was to take over French airline Air Littoral, but this fell through in the following month as Azzurra Air was in financial difficulties. In March 2004 operations were suspended when its regional fleet was withdrawn by lessor and co-owner Air Malta due to non-payment of leases. The company was declared bankrupt in July 2004. It had five Airbus A320-200 aircraft on order at the time.

Services 
Azzurra Air only operated one scheduled service from Bergamo to Rome using a Boeing 737-700. All other services were charter operations.

Fleet 

The aircraft fleet included:

References

External links

Italian companies established in 1995
Italian companies disestablished in 2004
Defunct airlines of Italy
Airlines established in 1995
Airlines disestablished in 2004